The Connecticut State House of Representatives is the lower house in the Connecticut General Assembly, the state legislature of the U.S. state of Connecticut. The house is composed of 151 members representing an equal number of districts, with each constituency containing nearly 22,600 residents. Representatives are elected to two-year terms with no term limits.
The House convenes within the Connecticut State Capitol in Hartford.

History
The House of Representatives has its basis in the earliest incarnation of the General Assembly, the "General Corte" established in 1636 whose membership was divided between six generally elected magistrates (the predecessor of the Connecticut Senate) and three-member "committees" representing each of the three towns of the Connecticut Colony (Hartford, Wethersfield, and Windsor). The Fundamental Orders of Connecticut, adopted in 1639, replaced the committees with deputies; each town would elect three or four deputies for six-month terms. Although the magistrates and deputies sat together, they voted separately and in 1645 it was decreed that a measure had to have the approval of both groups in order to pass. The Charter of 1662 reduced the number of deputies per town to no more than two, and also changed the title of the legislature to the General Assembly. It was in 1698 that the General Assembly divided itself into its current bicameral form, with the twelve assistants (that replaced the magistrates) as the Council (which became the Senate in the 1818 constitution) and the deputies as the House of Representatives, which began electing the Speaker to preside over it. The terms of representatives were raised to two years in 1884.

Leadership of the House
The Speaker of the House presides over the House of Representatives. The Speaker is elected by the majority party caucus followed by confirmation of the full House through the passage of a House resolution. In addition to presiding over the body, the Speaker is also its chief leadership position and controls the flow of legislation and committee assignments. Other House leaders, such as the majority and minority leaders, are elected by their respective party caucuses relative to their party's strength in the chamber.

The current Speaker is Matthew Ritter of the 1st House District the includes part of Hartford. The Majority Leader is Jason Rojas of the 9th House District which includes part of East Hartford and part of Manchester. The Minority Leader is Republican Vincent Candelora of the 86th House District that includes part of Durham, part of East Haven, part of Guilford, and North Branford.

Composition of the House of Representatives

List of current members
Current members of the Connecticut House of Representatives, as of March 7, 2023.

Past composition of the House of Representatives

Notable former House members

1700s
Jonathan Trumbull, Governor of Connecticut Colony, Governor of Connecticut
Roger Sherman, First Mayor of New Haven, Constitutional Signatory, United States Congressman, United States Senator
Jonathan Trumbull, Jr. Aide-de-camp to General Washington, Congressman, US Senator, 20th Governor of Connecticut
Jeremiah Wadsworth, Congressman, Constitutional Convention Member
John Davenport (Connecticut politician), Continental Army Officer, Congressman

1800s
Gideon Tomlinson, Congressman, US Senator, 25th Governor of Connecticut
Noah Webster, Dictionary author and educator
Henry W. Edwards, Congressman, US Senator, 27th and 29th Governor of Connecticut
Samuel A. Foot, Congressman, US Senator, 28th Governor of Connecticut
Isaac Toucey, Congressman, US Senator, United States Attorney General, Secretary of the Navy, 33rd Governor of Connecticut
William W. Eaton, Congressman and US Senator
Marcus H. Holcomb, Connecticut Attorney General, 66th Governor of Connecticut
Henry C. Deming, Congressman, Mayor of Hartford, Commander of the 12th Connecticut Infantry Regiment
John T. Wait, Congressman
William E. Simonds, Congressman, Patent Commissioner, Medal of Honor recipient
Augustus Brandegee Congressman, Mayor of New London
John Q. Tilson, Congressman
E. Stevens Henry, Connecticut State Treasurer, Congressman
P.T. Barnum, showman, politician, and businessman known for the Barnum and Bailey Circus.
Charles Phelps, lawyer, state legislator, Connecticut Secretary of State, and first Attorney General of Connecticut

1900s
Marcus H. Holcomb, Attorney General of Connecticut, 66th Governor of Connecticut
Everett J. Lake, 67th Governor of Connecticut
Raymond E. Baldwin, Congressman, United States Senator, 72nd and 74th Governor of Connecticut, Chief Justice of the Connecticut Court of Errors, Chair of the 1965 Constitutional Convention
Emily Sophie Brown, one of the first women to be elected to the Connecticut House of Representatives
Abraham A. Ribicoff, 80th Governor of Connecticut, United States Senator, United States Secretary of Health, Education, and Welfare
John N. Dempsey, 81st Governor of Connecticut
William R. Ratchford, Congressman
Stewart McKinney (politician), Congressman
Sam Gejdenson, Congressman
Ronald A. Sarasin, Congressman
Ella T. Grasso, 83rd Governor of Connecticut
Barbara B. Kennelly, Congresswoman
William O'Neill, 84th Governor of Connecticut
Lowell P. Weicker, Jr., Congressman, US Senator, 85th Governor of Connecticut
Sam Gejdenson, Congressman
John G. Rowland, 86th Governor of Connecticut
Gary Franks, Congressman
Christopher Shays, Congressman
Susan Bysiewicz, Lieutenant Govenor and Secretary of State.
George Jepsen￼, Connecticut Attorney General and Chair of the Connecticut Democratic Party.

2000s
Rob Simmons, Congressman
Jodi Rell, 87th Governor of Connecticut
Joe Courtney, Congressman
Richard Blumenthal, Connecticut Attorney General and US Senator
Chris Murphy, Congressman and US Senator.

2010s 
Elizabeth Esty, Congresswoman.
Denise Merrill, Connecticut Secretary of State.
William Tong, Connecticut Attorney General

2020s 

 Stephanie Thomas, Connecticut Secretary of State.
 Sean Scanlon, Connecticut State Controller.

See also
Connecticut State Capitol
Connecticut General Assembly
Connecticut Senate
List of members of the Connecticut General Assembly from Norwalk

References

External links
Connecticut House of Representatives
District search by address

Organizations established in 1698
House of Representatives
State lower houses in the United States
1698 establishments in Connecticut
Government agencies established in the 1690s